{{Infobox settlement
| name                    = Iskandar Puteri
| settlement_type         = City
| official_name           = City of Iskandar Puteri
| translit_lang1          = Other
| translit_lang1_type1    = Jawi
| translit_lang1_info1    = إسكندر ڤوتري
| translit_lang1_type2    = Chinese
| translit_lang1_info2    =   Yīsīgāndá Gōngzhǔ Chéng 
| translit_lang1_type3    = Tamil
| translit_lang1_info3    =  
| other_name              = 
| image_skyline           = 
| image_caption           = From top, left to right:The Dato' Jaafar Muhammad Building in Kota Iskandar, Legoland Malaysia Resort, the City Council, the Kota Iskandar Mosque, and the Sultan Ismail Building
| image_flag              =
| image_seal              = The emblem of Iskandar Puteri.png
| image_map               = 
| map_caption             = Location of Iskandar Puteri in Johor
| pushpin_map             = Malaysia Johor#Malaysia#Asia#Earth
| pushpin_mapsize         = 275px
| pushpin_map_caption     =  Iskandar Puteri in  Johor
| coordinates             = 
| subdivision_type        = Country
| subdivision_name        = 
| subdivision_type1       = State
| subdivision_name1       = 
| subdivision_type2       = District
| subdivision_name2       = Johor Bahru
| established_title       = Established
| established_date        = 16 April 2009 (as Kota Iskandar)
| established_title1      = City status
| established_date1       = 
|government_type          = City council
|governing_body           = Iskandar Puteri City Council
| leader_title            = Mayor
| leader_name             = Mohd Haffiz Ahmad
| population_footnotes    = 
| postal_code_type        = Postal code
| postal_code             = 79xxx
| blank_name_sec1         = Area code(s)
| blank_info_sec1         = +607
| website                 = 
| footnotes               = 
| timezone                = Malaysian Standard Time
| utc_offset              = +8
| timezone_DST            = Not observed
| area_total_km2          = 
| area_footnotes          = 
| population_total        =  (10th)
| population_as_of        = 2020
| population_density_km2  = auto
}}

Iskandar Puteri is a city which functions as the administrative capital of the state of Johor, Malaysia (Kota Iskandar) and represents the seat of government of the state of Johor (Executive branch & Legislative branch). Situated along the Straits of Johor at the southern end of the Malay Peninsula, it is also the southernmost city in Peninsular Malaysia.

Together with the adjacent cities of Johor Bahru (the official state capital of Johor) and Pasir Gudang, the three adjoining cities are commonly located within the Johor Bahru District and they anchor Malaysia's third largest urban agglomeration, Iskandar Malaysia, with a population of 2.2 million.

 History 
 Sempit Puteri 
Historically, the area around present-day Iskandar Puteri consisted of mostly fishing villages, populated by Malays and Orang Laut tribes. Located at the western side of the Tebrau Strait, the area was once known as Sempit Puteri (lit. narrow princess) as it was facing the narrowest part of the Tebrau Straits.

In 1855, when Temenggong Daeng Ibrahim won his claim over the Johor throne, he relocated the capital city of the now-divided kingdom from Telok Blangah (Singapore) to Tanjung Puteri and renamed it as Iskandar Puteri. The name, however, proved to be short-lived when his son Maharaja Abu Bakar, the first Sultan of Modern Johor, renamed Tanjung Puteri as Johor Bahru upon his coronation as the Maharaja of Johor in 1868 to distinguish his dynasty from the old Sultanate of Johor.

During Maharaja Abu Bakar's reign, Jaafar Muhammad was appointed as the first Menteri Besar of Johor. According to a story from Yayasan Warisan Johor, during his journey to Sempit Puteri, the paddle of the sampan that Dato Jaafar was boarding broke. That event gave the place its new name Gelang Patah (lit. broken paddle). 

As many as eight local councils (majlis tempatan) were set up in the 1950s and 1960s to oversee municipal works in the area. The smaller local councils were merged in March 1978 and replaced by the Central Johor Bahru District Council (Majlis Daerah Johor Bahru Tengah'', MDJBT), as the local authority in Johor Bahru's western and northern suburban areas, while MBJB administers downtown Johor Bahru. MDJBT was granted municipal status in 2001.

Nusajaya
In 1993, during the leadership of the fourth Prime Minister Mahathir Mohamad, a plan for a second bridge connecting the Peninsular Malaysia and Singapore was brought forward by Halim Saad, who at the time known as a successful young entrepreneur who built the Malaysia longest highway, North-South Expressway, and apprentice to the former Minister of Finance Daim Zainuddin. The cabinet approved the project as the traffic at the then Johor Causeway was already over-congested. The new bridge had been connected from the NSE via Second Link to Jurong East of Singapore. His past experience enabled Halim to secure financing from Bank for Renong Berhad (now UEM Group) to acquire vast land along with the Second Link for his ambitious new township which later known as Nusajaya. The Nusajaya name was given by former Menteri Besar of Johor, Muhyiddin Yassin.

UEM Group through its subsidiary UEM Land (now UEM Sunrise) continue to develop Nusajaya as the new city centre of Johor. A new administrative centre, Kota Iskandar was developed in Nusajaya based on the Federal Government administrative centre at Putrajaya as a catalyst to Nusajaya development. This is followed by the introduction of Iskandar Malaysia, Iskandar Regional Development Authority and Iskandar Investment Board to regulate and promote the development growth in Nusajaya. In 2008, the Johor State Parliement was moved from Sultan Ibrahim Building in Johor Bahru to Sultan Ismail Building in Kota Iskandar. Several other catalyst development were later added to Nusajaya. Among them are Legoland Malaysia Resort, Puteri Harbour and Pinewood Malaysia Studio (now, Iskandar Malaysia Studio) and Southern Industrial And Logistics Clusters (SiLC). A new city, Medini was also developed as the capital for Nusajaya. UEM also sold part of Nusajaya land to the other developer including Syed Mokhtar Albukhary's Tradewind, SP Setia (Bukit Indah & Setia Eco Garden), Ecoworld (Eco Botanic), and Sunway Group (Sunway Iskandar) to expedite the development of Nusajaya.

Iskandar Puteri
In January 2016, Nusajaya was renamed to its former prestigious name, Iskandar Puteri by Sultan Ibrahim, current Sultan of Johor. Johor Bahru Tengah Municipal Council was upgraded to Iskandar Puteri City Council on 22 November 2017.

Government 

Iskandar Puteri is Johor's second city, and Malaysia's 14th. It administered by the Iskandar Puteri City Council. It houses Kota Iskandar, the administrative centre for the government of Johor State. It houses the Johor State Legislative Assembly and Johor Chief Minister's Office. Mahkota Square also located here.

Due to electoral division by Election Commission of Malaysia, there are four parliamentary and eight state constituencies (DUN) dividing Iskandar Puteri area. There are (P161)  parliamentary seat, (N46) and (P162)  parliamentary seat.

Administrative divisions

Iskandar Puteri consists of 11 administrative zones:
 Iskandar Puteri
 Pulai
 Taman Universiti
 Taman Impian Emas
 Taman Mutiara Rini
 Taman Ungku Tun Aminah
 Bandar Uda Utama
 Taman Bukit Indah
 Gelang Patah
 Leisure Farm
 Tanjung Kupang

Demographics 
Iskandar Puteri is one of the cities in Malaysia. It is the second largest city in Johor. As of 2010, the municipal area of Iskandar Puteri has a population of 515,462. It ranks as the seventh most populous urban centre in Malaysia (2010).

The following is based on Department of Statistics Malaysia 2010 census.

Education 
EduCity is a 600-acre (2.4 km2) educational area, which consists of the University of Southampton Malaysia Campus, Newcastle University Medicine Malaysia, University of Reading, Multimedia University, Raffles University, Netherlands Maritime Institute of Technology, Management Development Institute of Singapore, Stellar International School, Marlborough College Malaysia and Raffles American School. Other universities in the city are University of Technology, Malaysia and Southern University College.

Medical
Afiat Healthpark was initially developed as the medical hub for Iskandar Puteri. Columbia Asia Iskandar Puteri was the first hospital being built in the city. This was followed by Gleneagles Medini and Kensington Specialist Centre.

Industry
Concurrent with the development of Iskandar Puteri, a new proposal was brought forward by the then State Secretary, Dato Ayob Mion to build a new port at the west coast of Johor. The new port, Port of Tanjung Pelepas was developed near the Second Link and become the catalyst for industrial development at the for Tanjung Kupang area at the west of Iskandar Puteri.

Later, UEM also developed Southern Industry and Logistic Cluster (SiLC) which hosting i-Park SiLC, IBP, Bio-excell and iTech Valley. SILC also host the largest insulin producer in the world Biocon and Insulet. This is followed by Nusa Cemerlang and Nusajaya Techpark at the adjacent land at Gelang Patah.

Tourist attraction 
Puteri Harbour (with a land area of 278 hectares or 688 arces) & Forest City is a marina development that spans 687 acres (2.8 km2) on the Straits of Johor. Sanrio Hello Kitty Town and Thomas Town were also located at Puteri Harbour.

Legoland Malaysia is one of the main attractions of Johor state, it is a  integrated complex containing the Legoland Malaysia and Legoland Water Park theme parks, plus a lifestyle retail centre, offices, hotels, service apartments and residential units. The main theme park includes 70 hands-on rides, slides, shows distributed among the LEGO Technic, LEGO Kingdoms, Imagination, Land of Adventure, Lego City and Minliand areas. Another attraction is the Legoland Hotel.

Shopping malls in the city are Paradigm Mall JB, B5 Johor Street Market, ÆON Bukit Indah, AEON Taman Universiti, GP Mall, Mall of Medini, Perling Mall, Sunway Big Box, Sutera Mall, Tasek Central and many more.

FASTrack City will open in 2019.

In March 2019, works on a new marina in Puteri Harbour kicked off, as a joint venture between SUTL Enterprise and UEM Sunrise. The first phase of the ONE°15 Marina Puteri Harbour membership was launched in November 2020, with the opening of ONE°15 Estuari Sports Centre. Johor Tourism, Youth and Sports Committee chairman, Datuk Onn Hafiz Bin Ghazi was the guest of honour at the opening launch. The integrated sports complex was launched with the intent to introduce a world-class sporting venue in Johor with the potential to host national and international sporting events.

Iskandar Puteri residences 
Townships such as Nusa Bayu, Gerbang Nusajaya, Setia Eco Gardens, Casa Almyra, Nusa Sentral, Taman Universiti, Nusa Indah, Taman Nusa Bestari Jaya, Bestari Heights, East Ledang, Estuari, Ledang Heights, Nusa Idaman, Nusa Bayu, Nusa Bestari, Nusa Bestari 2, Nusa Duta, Bukit Indah, Horizon Hills and Sunway Iskandar are located within this zone.

Transportation

Sea

The Port of Tanjung Pelepas, which ranks as Malaysia's largest container port since 2004 lies in the western side of the city. It is the 19th busiest container port in the world . Iskandar Puteri houses the Puteri Harbour International Ferry Terminal, with destinations to cities in Indonesia.

Rail
The planned  Kuala Lumpur–Singapore high-speed rail also will serve the city at Gerbang Nusajaya in the future. On 29 March 2021, Malaysia compensated Singapore S$102.8 million, with the settlement representing the complete termination of the project and bilateral agreement.

Road
Within Johor, the Iskandar Coastal Highway and Pasir Gudang Highway links the city to Johor Bahru City, while the Tanjung Kupang Road links the city to Pontian District. The Second Link Expressway and North–South Expressway connect the city to the other states in Peninsular Malaysia.

The Malaysia–Singapore Second Link was built between Kampong Ladang at Tanjung Kupang, Johor and Jalan Ahmad Ibrahim at Tuas, Singapore. The bridge was built to reduce the traffic congestion at the Johor–Singapore Causeway and was opened to traffic on 2 January 1998. The twin-deck bridge supports a dual-three lane carriageway and its total length over water is 1,920 m.

See also 
 UEM Land (now UEM Sunrise)
 Kota Iskandar, Johor
 Cahaya Jauhar
 Medini Iskandar Malaysia
 Nusa Bayu

References

External links 

 
 Onemap MBIP

 
South Johor Economic Region
Populated places in Johor
Malaysia–Singapore border crossings
Indonesia–Malaysia border crossings